The 2nd Politburo of the Communist Party of Cuba (PCC) was elected in 1980 by the 1st Plenary Session of the 2nd Central Committee, in the immediate aftermath of the 2nd Party Congress.

Members

Alternate members

References

Specific

Bibliography

2nd Politburo of the Communist Party of Cuba
1980 establishments in Cuba
1986 disestablishments in Cuba